Gordon Geoffrey Wetherell, CMG (born 11 November 1948) is a British diplomat who was the former Governor of the Turks and Caicos Islands. He was appointed on 5 August 2008, replacing Richard Tauwhare in the position. On 14 August 2009, he assumed direct political control when the British government imposed direct rule on the islands in response to a Foreign Office inquiry which found "information in abundance pointing to a high probability of systematic corruption or serious dishonesty" in the islands' administration under former Premier, Michael Misick.

He was educated at Bradfield College (in Bradfield, Berkshire), at New College, Oxford and at the University of Chicago. His Foreign Office career has included service in East Berlin, Geneva, New Delhi, and Warsaw.  From 1997 to 2000 he was the British ambassador to Ethiopia (and concurrently non-resident ambassador to Eritrea and Djibouti). He served as ambassador to Luxembourg from 2000 to 2004, and High Commissioner to Ghana from 2004 to 2007.

He was appointed Companion of the Order of St Michael and St George (CMG) in the 2011 Birthday Honours.

Governor Wetherell's last official meeting in office was with the Advisory Council on 11 August 2011, in Grand Turk. Wetherell departed the Providenciales, Turks and Caicos, on Sunday, 21 August 2011, ending his term as governor.

References
New governor arrives in Turks and Caicos on Monday

1948 births
Living people
People educated at Bradfield College
Alumni of New College, Oxford
University of Chicago alumni
Ambassadors of the United Kingdom to Luxembourg
Ambassadors of the United Kingdom to Ethiopia
Ambassadors of the United Kingdom to Eritrea
Ambassadors of the United Kingdom to Djibouti
Governors of the Turks and Caicos Islands
Companions of the Order of St Michael and St George
Members of HM Diplomatic Service
High Commissioners of the United Kingdom to Ghana
20th-century British diplomats
21st-century British diplomats